South Scotland is one of the eight electoral regions of the Scottish Parliament.  Nine of the parliament's 73 first past the post constituencies are sub-divisions of the region and it elects seven of the 56 additional-member Members of the Scottish Parliament (MSPs). Thus it elects a total of 16 MSPs.

The South Scotland region was created as a result of the First Periodic Review of Scottish Parliament Boundaries and largely replaced the 
South of Scotland region.

Constituencies and local government areas

2011–present
As a result of the  First Periodic Review of Scottish Parliament Boundaries the boundaries for the region and constituencies were redrawn for the 2011 Scottish Parliament election.

1999–2011
Prior to the First Periodic Review of Scottish Parliament Boundaries, the area which previously encompassed much of the South Scotland electoral region was known as the 'South of Scotland' electoral region. The constituencies were created in 1999 with the names and boundaries of Westminster constituencies, as existing in at that time.

The First Past the Post constituencies can be found below:

The region covered the following local government areas:
In full:
 Scottish Borders
 South Ayrshire
 Dumfries and Galloway
In part:
 East Ayrshire
 East Lothian
 Midlothian 
 North Ayrshire 
 South Lanarkshire

Members of the Scottish Parliament

Constituency MSPs

Regional List MSPs
N.B. This table is for presentation purposes only

Election results

2021 Scottish Parliament election 
In the 2021 Scottish Parliament election the region elected MSPs as follows:

 7 Scottish National Party MSPs (6 constituency members and 1 additional member)
 3 Labour MSPs (additional members)
 6 Conservative MSPs (3 constituency members and 3 additional member)

Constituency results 
{| class=wikitable
!colspan=4 style=background-color:#f2f2f2|2021 Scottish Parliament election: South Scotland
|-
! colspan=2 style="width: 200px"|Constituency
! style="width: 150px"|Elected member
! style="width: 300px"|Result

Additional Member results

2016 Scottish Parliament election 
In the 2016 Scottish Parliament election the region elected MSPs as follows:
 7 Scottish National Party MSPs (four constituency members and three additional members)
 6 Conservative MSPs (four constituency members and two additional members)
 3 Labour MSPs (one constituency member and two additional members)

Constituency results
{| class=wikitable
!colspan=4 style=background-color:#f2f2f2|2016 Scottish Parliament election: South Scotland
|-
! colspan=2 style="width: 200px"|Constituency
! style="width: 150px"|Elected member
! style="width: 300px"|Result

Additional member results
{| class=wikitable
!colspan=8 style=background-color:#f2f2f2|2016 Scottish Parliament election: South Scotland
|-
! colspan="2" style="width: 150px"|Party
! Elected candidates
! style="width: 40px"|Seats
! style="width: 40px"|+/−
! style="width: 50px"|Votes
! style="width: 40px"|%
! style="width: 40px"|+/−%
|-

2011 Scottish Parliament election 
In the 2011 Scottish Parliament election the region elected MSPs as follows:
 8 Scottish National Party MSPs (four constituency members and four additional members)
 4 Labour MSPs (two constituency members and two additional members)
 3 Conservative MSPs (all constituency members)
 1 Liberal Democrat MSP (additional member)

Constituency results
{| class=wikitable
!colspan=4 style=background-color:#f2f2f2|2011 Scottish Parliament election: South Scotland
|-
! colspan=2 style="width: 200px"|Constituency
! style="width: 150px"|Elected member
! style="width: 300px"|Result

Additional member results
{| class=wikitable
!colspan=8 style=background-color:#f2f2f2|2011 Scottish Parliament election: South Scotland
|-
! colspan="2" style="width: 150px"|Party
! Elected candidates
! style="width: 40px"|Seats
! style="width: 40px"|+/−
! style="width: 50px"|Votes
! style="width: 40px"|%
! style="width: 40px"|+/−%
|-

Footnotes 

Scottish Parliamentary regions
Scottish Parliament constituencies and regions from 2011
Politics of the Scottish Borders
Politics of East Lothian
Politics of Dumfries and Galloway
Politics of South Ayrshire
Politics of East Ayrshire
Politics of South Lanarkshire